"Demonstrate" is a song recorded by American recording artist JoJo, originally planned to be the lead single from her third studio album. It was written by JoJo, Daniel Daley, Anthony Jeffries and Noah "40" Shebib, the latter of whom also handled the song's production. The song's development was conceived after JoJo released a cover version of the song "Marvins Room" by Drake, which was also produced by Shebib. Following critical acclaim JoJo organised recording sessions with the producer to find a new more confident sound for her much-delayed third album.

Following the announcement that JoJo was moving into a new direction with the album, she also went on to announce that the R&B slow jam would serve as the album's lead single from the yet-to-be titled third studio album, replacing "Disaster", which was released almost a year earlier. Musically, "Demonstrate" is a R&B-leaning slow jam that comprises instruments like the guitar, drums and strings.

"Demonstrate" made its world premiere online & on US radio on July 17, 2012 and was scheduled for release to digital outlets on August 28, 2012 through Interscope, Blackground and Streamline Records, however, its release was eventually scrapped. Upon its release, "Demonstrate" received favorable reviews from critics generally praising the sexiness of the song with some who noted its similarities to Kelly Rowland's 2011 single "Motivation", with some claiming "Demonstrate" sounds exactly like a song someone like Rowland might release. Some critics complimented its musical direction, JoJo's sexy confidence and her growth and maturity in the song. On December 21, 2018, JoJo re-recorded and re-released the song as a stand-alone single from her own label Clover Music.

Background
JoJo's third studio release, which was announced in 2007, was originally slated to be titled "All I Want Is Everything" before morphing into "Jumping Trains" in 2011. Originally scheduled for release in early 2009, the album has been delayed for more than five years due to issues with her record label, Da Family Entertainment, and the sorting out of distribution for the album. The album was reported finalized in June 2009, but more recording sessions were done for the album up until January 2011. Her debut mixtape Can't Take That Away from Me was released on September 7, 2010 through Rap-Up.com as a prelude to her third album and to hold over her patient fans with a video released for the song "In The Dark". Initially, the pop rock-influenced "Disaster" served as the album's lead single in the United States. Following the announcement that JoJo was moving into a new direction with the album, she also went on to announce in an interview with 'Billboard magazine' that "'Demonstrate'" will now serve as the album's brand new lead single from the yet-to-be titled third studio album. Before the official announcement was made, JoJo, in an interview with Vibe Vixen, hinted at the fact that "Disaster" will no longer be on the album concluding to the idea that "Demonstrate" would in fact be the albums new lead single, saying
To be honest, I'm moving in a new direction. I haven't come out and said it, but if you listen to the difference between "Disaster" and "Demonstrate", they don't fit on the same album. So with the release of "Demonstrate" and the feedback it's been getting, it reconfirmed for me that I'm doing the right thing. I want a very consistent, cohesive body of work and that's what I'm working on finishing up. It doesn't really bother me that I've been working on something for four years. I just want it to be right. Whatever the timing happens to be, whether it's the end of this year or early next year, I just pray that it's right. I'm almost done with the tracks that I would consider the album to be. It’s just about fine-tuning and sitting down with my team and things like that.

"Demonstrate" was written by JoJo, Daniel Daley, Anthony Jeffries and Noah "40" Shebib who also produced the track. Noah "40" Shebib is known for his work on Drake's sophomore studio album, 'Take Care as well as Alicia Keys' "Un-Thinkable (I'm Ready)". "Demonstrate" is an R&B driven song and is about demonstrating your thoughts, she sings "Baby there’s a lot of freaky shit running my mind that/I can’t say, but I know I can demonstrate". It is set for release through digital distribution on August 28, 2012. following the release of Demonstrate JoJo says "I'm headed in a new direction, so I wanted to start fresh with new everything, 'Demonstrate' just felt like how I want to continue on with this journey and the next step. For me, the third album is a really big moment in someone's career, so I wanted to make sure that we are leading off with the right thing."

"Demonstrate" made its world premiere online & on US radio on July 17, 2012, and was scheduled for worldwide release to digital outlets on August 28, 2012. According to JoJo manager, the single was scheduled to be pushed up to an earlier release date and set for worldwide release. The cover art for "Demonstrate" was previewed on July 17, 2012 along with the release of the song. However, its digital and radio releases were eventually scrapped due to continuous issues with her record label Blackground Records.

On December 20, 2018, JoJo surprised fans with the re-release of Demonstrate along with her self-titled debut album, sophomore album The High Road and single Disaster, released under JoJo's new label imprint Clover Music on December 21. The decision to re-record the singles and albums came from the removal of all of JoJo's original music released under Blackground Records from all streaming and digital selling platforms. Blackground owns the master licensing to the original recordings and have control over its release. JoJo sought after getting the original songs and albums back online, but would never come to an agreement with the label. JoJo's lawyer stated they’d reached the end of the statute of limitations on the re-record clause which gave her the rights to “cover” her own music.

Music and lyrics
"Demonstrate" is a R&B slow jam song with a length of 3 minutes and 30 seconds (3:30). The track kicks off with an acoustic guitar intro, then glides into a serene, R&B-leaning slow jam. “I can’t say / but I know I can demonstrate / I can let my body explain / I know I can demonstrate,” JoJo sings Backed by a drum. The lyrics center around JoJo telling her man she has a little something on her mind, but she'd prefer to express herself through actions rather than words, and are accompanied by a "synth-saturated beat" produced by Noah “40″ Shebib. In terms of instruments, "Demonstrate" uses an acoustic guitar, programmed beats and pulsing synths in the chorus. Music critics, noted its similarities to Kelly Rowland's Motivation. JoJo stated the single was recorded and inspired after the praise she got after she released her own version of Drake's "Marvins Room" (Take Care, 2011), titled "Can't Do Better". "I was a little apprehensive," JoJo said of releasing the track due to its sexually explicit content. "But I think any thoughts were kind of dispelled when people responded so well to my version of 'Marvin's Room' I think that it was reassuring to me of the direction I wanted to go in". When speaking about working with Canadian producer Noah "40" Shebib, known for his work with Drake, she says "It was my dream, I really wanted to get in with him; he's the most exciting producer I've ever worked with. I've never seen a method like his, and it was very, very inspiring and it really kind of reinvigorated my creativity to be in there with him."

Critical response
"Demonstrate" received generally positive reviews from music critics, who noted its similarities to Kelly Rowland's 2011 single "Motivation" (Here I Am, 2011). Becky Bain from Idolator reviewed JoJo's song, claiming "This sounds exactly like a song someone like Kelly Rowland might release, and surprisingly, JoJo totally pulls it off. Bain also stated, "While every other hot young thing is hopping on trend and releasing electro-dubstep-techno-kichen-sink club-stompers in order to get noticed, we appreciate JoJo keeping things slow and sexy". Scott Shetler of PopCrush reviewed the song and gave it a rating of four out of five stars, writing "JoJo comfortably moves in and out of falsetto, sounding as sexy and confident as Mariah Carey ever has" Adelle Platon of Vibe Vixen called the song a "grown and sexy bedroom heater". Katharine St. Asaph of Popdust rated the song four out of five stars, noting JoJo's "Equally unsurprisingly, technically adept, switching between melisma and near-whispers, alto and head voice, with mere seconds between". Asaph also praised "her maturity" and "called demonstrate a stunning bit of interpretation and deserves far better than the “she’s all grown up!” narrative." Laura Sassano of OK! called the song "a definitely more sensual feel than her previous hits" and praised her "killer set of pipes". Jayvee from The Round Table stated that "Demonstrate" reminds him a lot of that "slinky, R&B vibe from "Are You That Somebody" which was made famous by R&B singer Aaliyah.

Christina Garibaldi of MTV praised the song of it maturity stating "The sexy, sultry R&B single shows maturity not only in its lyrical nature, but in JoJo's development as an artist." Rich Juzwiak from Gawker.com said "I have mostly ignored this girl, figuring she couldn't possibly have ditched the cheese of her teeny-bopping youth. I can ignore her no longer" also calling the song "Monster". Rick Jeffries from Stupiddope.com praised JoJo's sweet voice and heartfelt lyrics which brought a lot of personality and happiness to the song. Amanda Dobbins from Vulture.com called the song "a spacy, kind of strange sex jam". Marcel Salas from Global Grind applauded JoJo's "angelic and soulful riffs" throughout the song, while Renee Brown from Examiner.com said "Demonstrate" "certainly shows a mature, sexually advance JoJo on this track". Bradley Stern from MuuMuse.com said the song had a similar style to one of JoJo's songs "In The Dark" from her 2010 mixtape "Can't Take That Away from Me", while comparing it to artist like Prince & Beyoncé stating "it's a bit like Prince crossed with Beyoncé‘s 4, plus a touch of Kelly Rowland‘s bump 'n' grinders with Lil Wayne–"Motivation" and "Ice". In other words: It’s pure aural sex." Zara Golden from VH1 praised her for capably moving from "a near-whisper to an almost whistle-register and back without overwhelming the patently patient and self-conscious beat."

Music video
 
The official music video for "Demonstrate" was directed by Jason Beattie. The video was shot on August 13, 2012 inside a mansion in Beverly Hills when speaking concept of the video JoJo states "it plays on the line -I live in this fantasy where everything is amplified- so this is kind of my own personal twisted fantasy, where the colors are more vivid, everything is more sensual, sexy and kind of a little wild". In certain scenes in the video JoJo can be seen swinging on a giant chandelier. In a recent interview with TheYoungFolks.com when asked about whether the video will be released JoJo states " I have no idea what [Blackground Records] plans to do with that video; I’m not in control of that. My thought is probably not. I’m pretty sure they owe some people some money on that actually.".  The video was never released.

Track listings

Credits and personnel
Credits adapted from Spotify.

 JoJo – vocals, songwriting, background vocals
 Noah Shebib – production, songwriting
 Klynik - production 
 Ryan Gladieux – record engineering, mixing
 Daniel Daley – songwriting
 Anthony Jeffries – songwriting

Release history

References

External links

2012 singles
JoJo (singer) songs
Song recordings produced by 40 (record producer)
Songs written by 40 (record producer)
2012 songs
Blackground Records singles
Clover Music singles
Songs written by JoJo (singer)